The Psychoanalytic Study of the Child is an annual journal, published by Taylor & Francis, which contains scholarly articles on topics related to child psychiatry and psychoanalysis. The journal was founded in 1945 by Anna Freud, Heinz Hartmann, and Ernst Kris, and was previously published by Yale University Press.

Abstracting and indexing
The Psychoanalytic Study of the Child is indexed and abstracted in:
 Scopus
 Social Sciences Citation Index
 Web of Science

See also

International Journal of Psychoanalysis
Anna Freud Centre
Yale Child Study Center

External links 
 

Academic journals published by university presses of the United States
Annual journals
Psychoanalysis journals
Publications established in 1945